Zoltán Nagy (born 30 March 1974 in Debrecen, Hungary) is a retired Hungarian goalkeeper.

External links

1974 births
Living people
Hungarian footballers
Hungarian expatriate footballers
Association football goalkeepers
Debreceni VSC players
Anorthosis Famagusta F.C. players
Alki Larnaca FC players
Digenis Akritas Morphou FC players
Hapoel Ramat Gan F.C. players
Doxa Katokopias FC players
Omonia Aradippou players
Cypriot First Division players
Cypriot Second Division players
Expatriate footballers in Cyprus
Expatriate footballers in Israel
Sportspeople from Debrecen
21st-century Hungarian people